The Battle of Princeton Court House was fought May 15–17, 1862 in Mercer County, Virginia (now West Virginia) in conjunction with Stonewall Jackson's Valley Campaign. It was a minor victory for the Confederate States Army.

Background
By early May 1862, Union forces were positioned to invade Virginia at two places. Brig. Gen. Robert H. Milroy's column, its axis of march the Staunton-Parkersburg Turnpike, advanced from Cheat Mountain and occupied in succession Camp Allegheny, Monterey, McDowell, and Shenandoah Mountain. Retreating before the oncoming Federals, Confederate Brig. Gen. Edward "Allegheny" Johnson pulled back to Westview, six miles west of Staunton.

Battle

Union soldiers of Brig. Gen. Jacob D. Cox's District of Kanawha threatened the Virginia and Tennessee Railroad. By mid-May, the Federals, although ousted from Pearisburg, held Mercer County and braced for a lunge at the railroad. Confederate Brig. Gen. Humphrey Marshall arrived from Abingdon, Virginia, with the Army of East Kentucky.

Seizing the initiative, Marshall bested Cox's 1st and 2nd brigades during three days of fighting, May 15 to May 17, in Mercer County, centering on Princeton Courthouse. There were 129 casualties in total.

Aftermath
Breaking contact with the Confederates on the night of May 17, Cox withdrew 20 miles (30 km). Col. George Crook, commanding Cox's 3rd brigade, marched to and occupied the city of Lewisburg, where on May 23 he defeated Brig. Gen. Henry Heth's larger brigade in the Battle of Lewisburg. Crook withdrew upon learning that Thomas J. "Stonewall" Jackson's army had routed a Union division at Winchester on May 25.

References

Further reading
 
 

Princeton Court House
Princeton Court House
Princeton Court House
Battles of the American Civil War in West Virginia
Mercer County, West Virginia
1862 in the American Civil War
1862 in Virginia
May 1862 events